VT-Patrol is a short-range military unmanned aerial vehicle (UAV) manufactured by Viettel, the telecom + R&D branch of the Army. It saw its first flight in 2013.

Specifications
Each VT-Patrol has a height and width and weight of 2.31x0.78 m respectively. It also has a wingspan of 3.35; weights 26 kg; flight velocity of 100 - 150 km/h and an operational radio range of 50 km. HD and infrared camera sources can transmit back humanoid enemies in a range up to 600 meters. Plans for the UAV to enter services are done in 2013, and other plans for bigger Vietnamese designed-and-made UAVs are still on the way.

References

Unmanned military aircraft of Vietnam